Kosmos-2I (GRAU Index: 11K63, also known as Cosmos-2I and also known by the designation Kosmos-2) is the designation applied to two Soviet carrier rockets, members of the R-12 Kosmos rocket family, which were used to orbit satellites between 1961 and 1977. They were superseded by the R-14 derived Kosmos-3 and Kosmos-3M.

Launches

References

 https://web.archive.org/web/20080516224211/http://www.astronautix.com/lvs/koss63s1.htm
 https://web.archive.org/web/20130522015958/http://www.astronautix.com/lvs/kos11k63.htm

Space launch vehicles of the Soviet Union